Scott William Fitzgerald (born 13 December 1991) is a British professional boxer who has held the British super-welterweight title since 2019. As an amateur, he won the gold medal in the welterweight division at the 2014 Commonwealth Games.

Professional boxing record

References

External links 

1991 births
Living people
English male boxers
Welterweight boxers
Commonwealth Games gold medallists for England
Boxers at the 2014 Commonwealth Games
Sportspeople from Preston, Lancashire
Commonwealth Games medallists in boxing
England Boxing champions
Medallists at the 2014 Commonwealth Games